Nguluwan is a mixed language spoken on an atoll of that name between Yap and Palau. The grammar and lexicon are Yapese, but the phonology has been affected by Ulithian, and speakers are shifting to that language.

References

Oceanic languages
Languages of the Federated States of Micronesia
Admiralty Islands languages
Mixed languages